The Krasnov Rocks are a linear group of rocks  south-southeast of the summit of Mount Dallmann, in the Orvin Mountains of Queen Maud Land, Antarctica. They were mapped from air photos and surveys by the Sixth Norwegian Antarctic Expedition, 1956–60, were remapped by the Soviet Antarctic Expedition, 1960–61, and named after Russian geographer A.N. Krasnov.

References

Rock formations of Queen Maud Land
Princess Astrid Coast